Gladstone is a ghost town in the Boundary Country region of southern British Columbia.

Initially honouring William Ewart Gladstone, the name changed to Coryell in 1900. Jack Arthur Coryell was a well-known surveyor in the region. However, Coryell was still often called Gladstone. At its peak in 1898, Gladstone had 3 hotels, 3 stores, and a livery stable, among other businesses. Gladstone was built on mining and the railway. Many prospectors came to mine in the Burnt Basin locality.

References

Ghost towns in British Columbia